ClariS is a Japanese pop music duo which formed in 2009 with singers Clara and Alice from Hokkaido, who were in junior high school at the time. The pair began singing covers and submitting them to Japanese video sharing website Niconico between 2009 and 2010. ClariS later signed to SME Records and released their debut single "Irony" in October 2010. Three more singles were released between 2011 and 2012, followed by their debut album Birthday (2012). Birthday was awarded a Gold Disc by the Recording Industry Association of Japan for having exceeded 100,000 copies shipped in a single year. Six more singles were released between 2012 and 2014, which were featured on their second album Second Story (2013) and third album Party Time (2014). Alice left the unit following Party Time release, and Karen joined ClariS in late 2014. ClariS moved to the Sacra Music record label under Sony Music Entertainment Japan in 2017.

ClariS' music has been featured in anime series such as Oreimo, Puella Magi Madoka Magica, Nisemonogatari, Nisekoi, and Eromanga Sensei. They have also performed at the Nippon Budokan, and at anime music events in Japan such as Animax Musix and Animelo Summer Live. In November 2017, they made their first overseas appearance at Anime Festival Asia in Singapore.

The group was known for its members not showing their faces in public or revealing their identities. The group's members wear masks during live performances, and their persona has been represented by illustrations drawn by various artists for promotional material. However, they unmasked their faces twice while performing at their Pacifico Yokohama concert in 2017 and during their 10th anniversary concert in 2020. In 2022, they unmasked their faces in a music video for a remake of their song "Connect".

History

2009–2012: Formation and junior high school
ClariS formed in late 2009 as "Alice Clara" when, as first-year junior high school students, Clara and Alice submitted a cover of the Vocaloid song "Step to You" onto the Niconico video sharing website on October 10, 2009. ClariS released seven more covers in 2009. On April 24, 2010, the publisher Sony Magazines under Sony Music Entertainment Japan launched the anime music magazine LisAni! with an attached CD containing the original song "Drop" composed by Kz of Livetune and sung by ClariS. ClariS released five more covers in 2010, ending with the song "Listen!!" from the anime K-On!! as their 13th cover submitted on June 5, 2010. On July 24, 2010, the second issue of LisAni! was released with another attached CD containing the original song , again composed by Kz and sung by ClariS. A single containing both songs was released exclusively at Comiket 78 on August 13, 2010.

Much focus was put on Clara and Alice being in junior high school at the time. From early on when they uploaded their covers onto Niconico, there was some disbelief whether the girls were actually in junior high school and there were numerous comments on their adult-sounding voices. Despite this, Clara and Alice were described as simply normal junior high school girls, and while Kz felt much of their appeal came from them being in junior high school, he also felt their future potential played a part in it.

By September 2010, ClariS was signed to SME Records, much to the surprise of Clara and Alice. Alice would later remark that she had suspicions about it, and wondered if they were somehow being tricked. ClariS released their major debut single "Irony" on October 20, 2010. Composed by Kz, "Irony" debuted at No. 7 on Oricon's weekly singles chart, and was used as the opening theme of the 2010 anime television series Oreimo. Good Smile Company released a Nendoroid Petit set of ClariS in January 2012 based on the illustrations of Clara and Alice by Hiro Kanzaki for "Irony". ClariS released their second single  on February 2, 2011. "Connect" debuted at No. 5 on Oricon's weekly singles chart, and was used as the opening theme of the 2011 anime television series Puella Magi Madoka Magica. "Connect" was later awarded the Gold Disc by the Recording Industry Association of Japan (RIAJ) in January 2012 for having exceeded 100,000 copies shipped in a single year. ClariS contributed the song "True Blue" on the Zone tribute album  released on August 10, 2011; "True Blue" is a cover of Zone's 2003 single.

ClariS released their third single "Nexus" on September 14, 2011, and it debuted at No. 5 on Oricon's weekly singles chart. Again composed by Kz, "Nexus" was used as the opening theme of the Ore no Imōto ga Konna ni Kawaii Wake ga Nai Portable ga Tsuzuku Wake ga Nai video game, as well as the theme song for the ninth volume of the Ore no Imōto ga Konna ni Kawaii Wake ga Nai light novels; ClariS make a cameo appearance in the same volume. The song "Don't Cry" on the "Nexus" single was used as the theme song for volume 0.5 of Shueisha's Aoharu magazine. ClariS released their fourth single  on February 1, 2012, and it debuted at No. 2 on Oricon's weekly singles chart. "Naisho no Hanashi" was composed by Ryo of Supercell and is used as the ending theme of the 2012 anime television series Nisemonogatari.

2012–2014: High school and Alice's departure
Clara and Alice graduated from junior high school in March 2012. ClariS released their debut studio album Birthday on April 11, 2012. The album was released in three editions: a regular edition of just the CD, a limited edition bundled with a DVD, and another limited edition bundled with two Nendoroid Petit figures of ClariS based on the illustrations of Clara and Alice by Ume Aoki for "Connect", and a bonus CD with two Nendoroid theme songs. Birthday was awarded a Gold Disc by the RIAJ in May 2012. ClariS released their fifth single "Wake Up" on August 15, 2012; the song is used as the opening theme to the 2012 anime television series Moyashimon Returns. Their sixth single  was released on October 10, 2012; the song is used as the opening theme to the first two Puella Magi Madoka Magica anime films. "Luminous" was awarded a Gold Disc by the RIAJ in December 2014. Their seventh single "Reunion", composed by Kz, was released on April 17, 2013; the song is used as the opening theme to the 2013 anime television series Ore no Imōto ga Konna ni Kawaii Wake ga Nai., the series' second season.

ClariS released their second studio album Second Story on June 26, 2013. Their eighth single  was released on October 30, 2013; the song is used as the opening theme to the film Puella Magi Madoka Magica: Rebellion. ClariS made their first live performance at Zepp Tokyo on January 5, 2014 where they performed "Reunion" at a sold-out event behind a curtain and only visible as silhouettes. Their ninth single "Click", composed by Kz, was released on January 29, 2014; the song is used as the first opening theme to the 2014 anime television series Nisekoi. Their tenth single "Step", again composed by Kz, was released on April 16, 2014; the song is used as the second opening theme to Nisekoi. ClariS released their third studio album Party Time on June 4, 2014, which was Alice's last contribution to ClariS.

2014–present: Karen's debut
Following Alice's departure, Clara denied rumors that ClariS would disband. On November 8, 2014, volume 19 of M-ON! Entertainment's LisAni! magazine was released with an attached CD containing the original song "Clear Sky" sung by ClariS, now composed of Clara and Karen, who, like Clara, was still in high school at the time. ClariS released their 11th single "Border" on January 7, 2015; the song is used as the ending theme to the 2014 anime series Tsukimonogatari. ClariS performed live at the LisAni! Live-5 concert on January 25, 2015 at the Nippon Budokan. Clara and Karen graduated from high school in March 2015. ClariS released their first compilation album ClariS: Single Best 1st on April 15, 2015.

ClariS released their 12th single  on July 29, 2015; the song is used as the ending theme to the 2015 anime series Classroom Crisis. ClariS performed live at Zepp Tokyo on July 31, 2015. ClariS released their 13th single "Prism" on November 25, 2015; the song was used to promote the 40th anniversary of Sanrio's mascots Kiki and Lala. ClariS released their first EP  on March 2, 2016, ClariS released their 14th single "Gravity" on July 27, 2016; the song is used as the first ending theme to the 2016 anime series Qualidea Code. ClariS collaborated with Garnidelia in performing the song "Clever" released on September 14, 2016; the song is used as the third ending theme to Qualidea Code. ClariS released their 15th single "Again" on November 30, 2016; the song is used as the theme song of the video game Akiba's Beat. ClariS released their fourth studio album Fairy Castle on January 25, 2017.

ClariS performed their first concert at Nippon Budokan on February 10, 2017. They then moved to the Sacra Music record label under Sony Music Entertainment Japan in April 2017. They released their 16th single  on April 26, 2017; the song is used as the opening theme to the 2017 anime series Eromanga Sensei. They released their 17th single "Shiori" on September 13, 2017; the song is used as the ending theme to the second season of the anime series Owarimonogatari. They revealed their faces during their second concert in Pacifico Yokohama National Hall Convention on September 16, 2017. They also appeared at Animelo Summer Live 2017. They made their first appearance at a foreign anime convention at Anime Festival Asia in Singapore in November 2017. They released their 18th single "Primalove" digitally on January 20, 2018 and it received a physical release on February 28, 2018; the song is used as the ending theme of the 2018 anime series Beatless. They released their 19th single "CheerS" digitally on August 4, 2018 and it received a physical release on August 15, 2018; the song is used as the ending theme to the 2018 anime series Cells at Work!. They released their fifth studio album Fairy Party on November 21, 2018.

ClariS released their second EP  on August 14, 2019. They released their 20th single  on March 4, 2020; "Alethea" is used as the ending theme to the 2020 anime series Magia Record, while "Signal" was used as an image song for the Magia Record mobile game app; "Signal" was released digitally on August 13, 2019. Their 21st single "Fight!!" was released on February 17, 2021; the song was used as the ending theme to the second season of the anime series Cells at Work!. In 2022 they released the single "Alive"; the title song was used as the opening theme to the anime series Lycoris Recoil.

Members
From their formation until 2014, ClariS consisted of two girls from Hokkaido known as Clara and Alice (both pseudonyms, done so to preserve their anonymity) who were originally in junior high school. ClariS is a portmanteau of the singers' names and was picked as an homage to the character Clarisse from the anime film The Castle of Cagliostro. As listed on their website, "ClariS" can also carry the meaning of "clear" and "bright" in Latin (though it is actually spelled "clarus"). Both Clara and Alice have been singing since they were in kindergarten when they started taking lessons at the same music school where they met as classmates. Clara can play the piano.

In order to put a priority on their schoolwork, ClariS have not released photos of themselves to the public and employ illustrators to draw their likenesses. When drawn, Clara is depicted wearing pastel pink items, and Alice is shown wearing blue items. Images of the crescent moon are used as a motif to represent Clara, and the sun is used to represent Alice, which comes from their personal preferences. Clara is shown with slightly wavy hair and no bangs, while Alice is drawn with straight hair with bangs. To further preserve their anonymity, Clara and Alice have not told anyone they know (aside from their families) that they debuted as music artists. Both admit that they are otaku, and have taken an interest in anime and anime music. Clara says that she keeps her otaku interests a secret from others at school, and Alice has called herself a Disney otaku.

Alice left ClariS in late 2014 to focus on her studies, which left Clara to continue rehearsing by herself. Accompanying Clara during this time was her friend Karen, who she met and became acquainted with when they were classmates at the same music school. Invigorated by Karen's personality, which Clara notes is very different from her own, Clara personally nominated Karen to succeed Alice as the second member of ClariS. According to Clara, Karen is "innocent and energetic," but also has a stoical part to her personality. When drawn, Karen is depicted wearing pastel green items, and images of stars are used to represent her.

Discography

Albums

Studio albums

Compilation albums

EPs

Singles

Collaborations

Music videos

Other album appearances

Niconico cover songs

Notes

References

External links
 
 
 

2009 establishments in Japan
Anime musicians
Bands with fictional stage personas
Japanese girl groups
Japanese idol groups
Japanese musical duos
Japanese pop music groups
Japanese electropop groups
Masked musicians
Musical groups established in 2009
Musical groups from Hokkaido
Puella Magi Madoka Magica
Sacra Music artists
Sony Music Entertainment Japan artists
Female musical duos
Utaite